The Governor, or , of a province of Finland headed the activities of the State Provincial Office, or  until the end of 2009, when the provinces were abolished. The governors were appointed by the President. Many former ministers including but not limited to Kaarlo Hillilä, Martti Miettunen, Hannele Pokka and Anneli Taina served as governors, since the post was regarded as prestigious enough for a retiring minister, but still politically neutral. The title of maaherra was also considered a personal title, such that once appointed, the title maaherra remained for life.

During the Swedish period (1634–1809) and the Russian period (1809–1917) the governor was a royal plenipotentiary, representing the sovereign, but with independence, the function was reversed: the governor represented his territory to the central government.

List of Provincial Governors

Province of Turku and Pori 1634–1997 

Bror Rålamb 1634–1637  
Melkior von Falkenberg 1637–1641  
Melkior von Falkenberg 1641–1642 (Province of Åbo)  
Knut Lillienhöök 1642–1646 (Province of Åbo)   
No governor 1641–1646 (Province of Björneborg)   
Knut Lillienhöök 1647–1648  
Lorentz Creutz (elder) 1649–1655  
Erik von der Linde 1655–1666  
Ernst Johan Creutz (elder) 1666  
Harald Oxe 1666–1682  
Lorenz Creutz (younger) 1682–1698  
Jakob Bure 1698–1706  
Justus von Palmberg 1706–1714  
Johan Stiernstedt 1711–1713 (acting) and 1714–1722  
Otto Reinhold Yxkull 1722–1746  
Lars Johan Ehrenmalm 1744–1747 (acting) and 1747–1749  
Johan Georg Lillienberg 1749–1757  
Jeremias Wallén 1757–1768  
Kristoffer Johan Rappe 1769–1776  
Fredrik Ulrik von Rosen 1776–1781  
Nils Fredenskiöld 1780 (acting)
Magnus Wilhelm Armfelt 1782–1790  
Joakim von Glan 1790–1791 (acting) 
Ernst Gustaf von Willebrand 1790–1806  
Olof Wibelius 1801–1802 (acting) 
Knut von Troil 1806–1816  
Otto Herman Lode 1811–1813 (acting) 
Carl Erik Mannerheim 1816–1826  
Lars Gabriel von Haartman 1820–1822 (acting)
Eric Wallenius 1822–1826 (acting) and 1826–1828  
Adolf Broberg 1828–1831  
Lars Gabriel von Haartman 1831–1842 
Gabriel Anton Cronstedt 1840–1842 (acting) and 1842–1856  
Samuel Werner von Troil 1856 (acting) 
Carl Fabian Langenskiöld 1856–1858  
Selim Mohamed Ekbom 1857–1858 (acting) 
Johan Axel Cedercreutz 1858–1863 (acting) and 1863  
Carl Magnus Creutz 1864–1866 (acting) and 1866–1889  
Axel Gustaf Samuel von Troil 1889–1891  
Wilhelm Theodor von Kraemer 1891–1903  
Theodor Hjalmar Lang 1903–1905  
Knut Gustaf Nikolai Borgenström 1905–1911  
Eliel Ilmari Wuorinen 1911–1917  
Albert Alexander von Hellens 1917 (acting) 
Kaarlo Collan 1917–1922
Ilmari Helenius 1922–1932
Wilho Kyttä 1932–1949
Erkki Härmä 1949–1957
Esko Kulovaara 1957–1971
Sylvi Siltanen 1972–1977
Paavo Aitio 1977–1985
Pirkko Työläjärvi 1985–1997

Province of Nyland and Tavastehus 1634–1831 

Arvid Göransson Horn af Kanckas 1634–1640 
Arvid Göransson Horn af Kanckas 1640–1648 (Province of Tavastehus) 
Reinhold Mettstake 1640–1642 (Province of Nyland) 
Jacob Uggla 1642–1648 (Province of Nyland) 
Erik Andersson Oxe 1648–1652  
Ernst Johan Greutz 1652–1666  
Udde Knutsson Ödell 1666–1668  
Axel Eriksson Stålarm 1668–1678  
Axel Rosenhane 1678–1685  
Jonas Klingstedt 1685–1687  
Karl Bonde 1687–1695  
Mårten Lindhielm 1695–1696  
Abraham Cronhjort 1696–1703  
Johan Creutz 1703–1719  
Per Stierncrantz 1719–1737  
Axel Erik Gyllenstierna af Lundholm 1737–1746  
Gustaf Samuel Gylleborg 1746–1756  
Anders Johan Nordenskjöld 1756–1761  
Hans Erik Boije af Gennäs 1761–1772  
Carl Ribbing af Koberg 1773  
Anders Henrik Ramsay 1774–1776  
Anders de Bruce 1777–1786  
Carl Gustaf Armfelt 1787–1788  
Johan Henrik Munck 1790–1809    
Gustaf Fredrik Stiernwall 1810–1815  
Gustaf Hjärne 1816–1828  
Carl Klick 1828–1831

Province of Ostrobothnia 1634–1775  
 
Melcher Wernstedt 1635–1642  
Hans Kyle 1642–1648 (Province of Vasa)  
Erik Soop 1644–1648 (Province of Uleåborg)  
Hans Kyle 1648–1650   
Ture Svensson Ribbing 1650–1654  
Johan Graan 1654–1668  
Jacob Duwall 1668–1669  
Johan Graan 1669–1674  
Didrik Wrangel af Adinal 1674–1685  
Gustaf Grass 1685–1694  
Johan Nilsson Ehrenskiöldh 1694–1706  
Johan Stiernstedt 1706 (acting) 
Lorentz Clerk 1706–1720  
Reinhold Wilhelm von Essen 1720–1732  
Carl Henrik Wrangel af Adinal 1732  
Broor Rålamb 1733–1734  
Carl Frölich 1734–1739  
Gustaf Creutz 1739–1746  
Gustaf Abraham Piper 1746–1761  
Gustaf von Grooth 1761–1762  
Carl Sparre 1763  
Fredrik Henrik Sparre 1763  
Lorentz Johan Göös 1763–1774  
Fredrik Magnus von Numers 1774 (acting)

Province of Viborg and Nyslott 1634–1721 

 Åke Eriksson Oxenstierna 1634–1637
 Erik Gyllenstierna 1637–1641
 Karl Mörner 1641–1644 (Province of Viborg)
 Johan Rosenhane 1644–1650 (Province of Viborg)
 Herman Fleming 1641–1645 (Province of Nyslott)
 Mikael von Jordan 1645–1650 (Province of Nyslott)
 Johan Rosenhane 1650–1655
 Axel Axelsson Stålarm 1655–1656
 Anders Koskull 1656–1657
 Erik Kruse 1657–1658
 Jakob Törnsköld 1658–1667
 Conrad Gyllenstierna 1667–1674
 Fabian Wrede 1675–1681
 Carl Falkenberg 1681–1686
 Anders Lindhielm 1689–1704
 Georg Lybecker 1705–1712

Province of Kexholm 1634–1721 

 Henrik Månsson 1634–1636
 Magnus Nieroth 1636–1641
 Henrik Piper 1641–1642 (acting)
 Reinhold Mettstake 1642–1652
 Jakob Törnsköld 1652–1656
 Karl von Scheiding 1657–1660
 Patrick Ogilwie 1660–1674
 Berendt Mellin 1674–1690

Province of Kymmenegård and Nyslott 1721–1747 

Johan Henrik Friesenheim 1721–1737 
Joachim von Dittmer 1738–1741 
Carl Johan Stiernstedt 1741–1746

Province of Savolax and Kymmenegård 1747–1775 

Henrik Jacob Wrede af Elimä 1747–1753 
Anders Johan Nordenskjöld 1753–1756 
Otto Wilhelm De Geer 1757–1765 
Anders Henrik Ramsay 1765–1774

Province of Vaasa 1775–1997 

Bror Cederström 1775–1785  
Adolf Tandefeldt 1785–1794  
Carl Fridrik Krabbe 1794–1805  
Magnus Wanberg 1805–1808  
Nils Fredric von Schoultz 1808 
Carl Constantin de Carnall 1808–1822  
Herman Henrik Wärnhjelm 1822–1830  
Gustaf Magnus Armfelt 1830–1832  
Carl Gustaf von Mannerheim 1832–1833 (acting) and 1833–1834  
Carl Olof Cronstedt 1834–1837 (acting) and 1837–1845  
John Ferdinand Bergenheim 1845–1847  
Berndt Federley 1847–1854
Alexander von Rechenberg 1854–1858  
Otto Leonard von Blom 1858–1861  
Carl Gustaf Fabian Wrede 1862–1863 (acting) and 1863–1884 
Viktor Napoleon Procopé 1884–1888  
August Alexander Järnefelt 1888–1894  
Fredrik Waldemar Schauman 1894–1898  
Gustaf Axel von Kothen 1898–1900  
Fredrik Geronimo Björnberg 1900–1903  
Theodor Knipovitsch 1903–1906  
Kasten Fredrik Ferdinand de Pont 1906–1910  
Bernhard Otto Widnäs 1910–1913  
Nikolai Sillman 1913–1916  
Leo Aristides Sirelius 1916–1917  
Juho Torppa 1917 (acting)
Teodor August Heikel 1917–1920  
Bruno Sarlin 1920–1930
Erik Heinrichs 1930
Kaarlo Martonen 1930–1938  
Jalo Lahdensuo 1938–1943
Toivo Tarjanne 1943–1944  
K. G. R. Ahlbäck 1944–1967
Martti Viitanen 1967–1977
Antti Pohjonen 1977–1978
Mauno Kangasniemi 1978–1991
Tom Westergård 1991–1997

Province of Oulu 1775–2009 

Carl Magnus Jägerhorn 1775–1782
Adolf Tandefelt 1782–1785
Johan Fredrik Carpelan 1785–1800
Samuel af Forselles 1800–1802
Adolf Edelsvärd 1802–1804
Jakob Daniel Lange 1805–1808
Carl Henrik Ehrenstolpe 1809–1820
Samuel Fredrik von Born 1820–1826
Johan Abraham Stjernschantz 1826–1834
Robert Wilhelm Lagerborg 1834–1849
Alexander Lavonius 1849–1862
George von Alfthan 1862–1873
Otto Nyberg 1873–1879
Carl Johan Jägerhorn 1878–1883
Carl Adolf Tamelander 1883–1884
Johan Gabriel Masalin 1884–1886
Johan Axel Gripenberg 1886–1889
Anders Johan Malmgrén 1889–1897
Gustaf Esaias Fellman 1897–1901
Edvard Furuhjelm 1901–1903
Otto Savander 1903–1905
Guido Gadolin 1905–1911
Hjalmar Langinkoski 1911–1915
Axel Fabian af Enehjelm 1915–1917
Matts von Nandelstadh 1917–1925
Eero Pehkonen 1925–1948
Kaarle Määttä 1949–1967
Niilo Ryhtä 1967–1973
Erkki Haukipuro 1973–1986
Ahti Pekkala 1986–1991 
Eino Siuruainen 1991–2009

Province of Kymmenegård 1775–1831 

Gustaf Riddercreutz 1774–1783
Robert Wilhelm de Geer af Tervik 1783–1789
Otto Wilhelm Ramsay 1789–1792    
Herman af Låstbom 1793               
Otto Wilhelm Ramsay 1793    
Johan Herman Lode 1793–1810                
Fredrik Adolf Jägerhorn af Spurila 1810–1812           
Anders Gustaf Langenskiöld 1812–1827       
Adolf Broberg 1827–1828                
Erik Wallenius 1828                    
Abraham Joakim Molander 1828–1831

Province of Savolax and Karelia 1775–1831 

Otto Ernst Boije 1775–1781
Georg Henrik von Wrigh 1781–1786 
Simon Vilhelm Carpelan 1786–1791 
Anders Johan Ramsay 1791–1803 
Eric Johan von Fieandt 1803 
Olof Wibelius 1803–1809 
Simon Vilhelm Carpelan 1809–1810 
Gustaf Aminoff 1810–1827 
Carl Klick 1828–1829 
Lars Sacklen 1829–1831

Province of Viipuri 1812–1945 

 Carl Johan Stjernvall 1812–1815
 Carl Johan Walleen 1816–1820
 Otto Wilhelm Klinckowström 1820–1821 (acting) and 1821–1825
 Carl August Ramsay 1825–1827 (acting) and 1827–1834
 Carl Gustaf von Mannerheim 1834–1839
 Fredric Stewen 1839–1844
 Casimir von Kothen 1844–1846 (acting) and 1846–1853
 Alexander Thesleff 1853–1856
 Bernhard Indrenius 1856–1866
 Christian Theodor Åker-Blom 1866–1882
 Woldemar von Daehn 1882–1885
 Sten Carl Tudeer 1885–1888 (acting) and 1888–1889 
 Johan Axel Gripenberg 1889–1899
 Nikolai von Rechenberg 1900–1902
 Nikolai Mjasojedov 1902–1905
 Konstantin Kazansky 1905 (acting) and 1905
 Mikael von Medem 1905–1906 (acting)
 Nikolai von Rechenberg 1906-1907 
 Birger Gustaf Samuel von Troil 1907–1910
 Frans Carl Fredrik Josef von Pfaler 1910–1917
 Antti Hackzell 1918–1920 
 Lauri Kristian Relander 1920–1925
 Arvo Manner 1925–1945

Province of Uusimaa 1831–1997 
 Johan Ulrik Sebastian Gripenberg 1831
 Gustaf Magnus Armfelt 1832–1847       
 Johan Mauritz Nordenstam 1847–1858
 Samuel Henrik Antell 1858–1862         
 Vladimir Alfons Walleen 1862–1869
 Theodor Thilén 1869–1873
 Georg von Alfthan 1873–1888
 Victor Napoleon Procopé 1888
 Hjalmar Georg Palin 1888–1897
 Kasten de Pont 1897–1900
 Mikhail Nikiforovitsh Kaigorodoff 1901–1905
 Anatol Anatolievitsch Rheinbott 1905
 Alexander Lvovsky 1905–1906
 Max Theodor Alfthan 1906–1910
 Eugraf Nyman 1910–1917
 Bernhard Otto Widnäs 1913–1917
 Bruno Jalander 1917–1932
 Ilmari Helenius 1932–1944
 Armas-Eino Martola 1944–1946
 Väinö Meltti 1946–1964
 Reino Lehto 1964–1966
 Kaarlo Pitsinki 1966–1982
 Jacob Söderman 1982–1989
 Eva-Riitta Siitonen 1990–1996
 Pekka Silventoinen 1996–1997

Province of Häme 1831–1997 

 Carl Klick 1831
 Jakob Snellman 1831 (acting)
 Johan Fredrik Stichaeus 1831–1841
 Carl Otto Rehbinder 1841–1863
 Samuel Werner von Troil 1863–1865
 Clas Herman Molander 1865–1869
 Hjalmar (Sebastian) Nordenstreng 1870–1875
 Edvard (Reinhold) von Ammondt 1875–1887
 Torsten Costiander 1887–1895
 Edvard Boehm 1895–1899
 Gustaf Axel von Kothen 1900–1901
 Isidor Svertschkoff 1901–1904
 Alexander Pappkoff 1904–1906
 Ivar (Sune) Gordie 1906–1910
 Arthur Brofeldt 1910–1911 (acting)
 Rafael Knut Harald Spåre 1911–1917
 Kustaa Adolf Saarinen 1917–1918 (acting)
 Antti Tulenheimo 1918–1919
 Albert von Hellens 1919–1930
 Sigurd Mattsson 1930–1959
 Jorma Tuominen 1959–1972
 Valdemar Sandelin 1973–1979
 Risto Tainio 1979–1994
 Kaarina Suonio 1994–1997

Province of Mikkeli 1831–1997 

Abraham Joakim Molander-Nordenheim 1831–1837 
Gabriel Anton Cronstedt 1837–1840 
Otto Abraham Boije 1840–1847 
Alexander Thesleff 1847–1853 
Carl Fabian Langenskiöld 1853–1854 
Carl Emil Cedercreutz 1854–1856 
Bernhard Indrenius 1856 
Samuel Werner von Troil 1856–1863 
Theodor Sebastian Gustaf Thilén 1863–1869 
Carl Gustav Mortimer von Kraemer 1869–1873 
Edvard Reinhold von Ammondt 1874–1875 
Hjalmar Sebastian Nordenstreng 1876–1883 
August Alexander Järnefelt 1883–1884 
Gustav Axel Samuel von Troil 1884–1889 
Johannes Gripenberg 1889–1891 
Knut Robert Carl Walfrid Spåre 1891–1899 
Lennart Fritiof Munck 1900–1903 
Aleksander Watatzi 1903–1905 
Anton Leonard von Knorring 1905–1910 
Eliel Ilmari Vuorinen 1910–1911 
Leo Aristides Sirelius 1911–1916 
Nikolai Sillman 1916–1917 
Aleksanteri August Aho 1917 
 Ernst Edvard Rosenqvist 1918–1927 
 Albin Pulkkinen 1927–1933 
 Emil Jatkola 1933–1948 
 Alpo Lumme 1949–1957 
 Urho Kiukas 1957–1970
 Viljo Virtanen 1970–1979 
 Uuno Voutilainen 1979–1989 
 Juhani Kortesalmi 1989–1997

Province of Kuopio 1831–1997 

 Lars Sackleen 1831–1833
 Gustaf Adolf Ramsay 1833–1854
 Berndt Federley 1854–1855
 Sten Knut Johan Furuhjelm 1855–1862
 Samuel Henrik Antell 1862–1866
 Johan August von Essen 1866–1873
 Carl Gustaf Mortimer von Kraemer 1873–1884
 August Alexander Järnefelt 1884–1888
 Johan Fredrik Gustaf Aminoff 1888–1899
 Henrik Åkerman 1899–1900
 Edvard Gabriel Krogius 1900–1903
 Martin Alexius Bergh (Martti Vuori) 1903–1905
 Emil Wilhelm Stenius 1905–1911
 Werner Nikolaus Tavaststjerna 1911–1913
 Arthur Spåre 1913–1917
 Albert von Hellens 1917–1918
 Gustaf Ignatius 1918–1940
 Pekka Heikkinen 1940–1950
 Lauri Riikonen 1950–1960
 Erkki O. Mantere 1960–1966
 Risto Hölttä 1966–1978
 Kauko Hjerppe 1978–1993
 Olavi Martikainen 1993–1997

Province of Åland 1918–2009 

 Hjalmar von Bonsdorff 1918
 William Isaksson 1918–1922
 Lars Wilhelm Fagerlund 1922–1937
 Torsten Rothberg 1938
 Ruben Österberg 1939–1945
 Herman Koroleff 1945–1953
 Tor Brenning 1954–1972
 Martin Isaksson 1972–1982
 Henrik Gustavsson 1982–1999
 Peter Lindbäck 1999–2009

Province of Petsamo 1921–1921 

 Ilmari Helenius 1921

Province of Lapland 1938–2009 

 Kaarlo Hillilä 1938–1947
 Uuno Hannula 1947–1958
 Martti Miettunen 1958–1973
 Asko Oinas 1974–1994
 Hannele Pokka 1994–2008
 Timo E. Korva 2008–2009

Province of Kymi 1945–1997 

 Arvo Manner 1945–1955
 Artturi Ranta 1955–1964
 Esko Peltonen 1965–1975
 Erkki Huurtamo 1975–1984
 Matti Jaatinen 1984–1993
 Mauri Miettinen 1993–1997

Province of Central Finland 1960–1997 

 Eino Palovesi 1960–1972
 Artturi Jämsén 1972–1976
 Kauko Sipponen 1976–1985
 Kalevi Kivistö 1985–1997

Province of Northern Karelia 1960–1997 

 Lauri Riikonen 1960–1967
 Esa Timonen 1967–1992
 Hannu Tenhiälä 1992–1997

Province of Southern Finland 1997–2009 

 Tuula Linnainmaa 1997–2003
 Anneli Taina 2003–2009

Province of Western Finland 1997–2009 

 Heikki Koski 1997–2003
 Rauno Saari 2003–2009

Province of Eastern Finland 1997–2009 

 Pirjo Ala-Kapee 1997–2009

Governors of Västernorrland County, Västerbotten County, Saint Petersburg Governorate and Vyborg Governorate 
Governors of Västernorrland County and Västerbotten County ruled in 1634–1809 also northern part of Finnish Lapland and eastern part of Torne Valley. Governors of Saint Petersburg Governorate and Vyborg Governorate ruled Old Finland (predecessor of Province of Viipuri) in 1721–1812.

Västernorrland County 1634–1638 

Stellan Otto von Mörner 1634–1638

Västerbotten County 1638–1809 

Stellan Otto von Mörner 1638–1641
Frans Crusebjörn 1641–1653
Johan Graan 1653–1679
Jakob Fleming 1679
Hans Clerck 1680–1683
Hans Abraham Kruuse af Verchou 1683–1688
Reinhold Johan von Fersen 1688
Gotthard Strijk 1688–1692
Arvid Horn 1692
Gustaf Douglas 1692–1705
Otto Wilhelm Löwen 1705–1712 
Anders Erik Ramsay 1713–1717 
Fredrik Magnus Cronberg 1717–1719
Otto Reinhold Strömfelt 1719
Carl Paulin Lagerflycht 1719
Jacob Grundel 1719–1733
Gabriel Gabrielsson Gyllengrip 1733–1753
Olof Leijonstedt 1755–1759
Johan Funck 1759–1762
Martin Ehrensvan 1762–1765
Olof Malmerfelt 1765–1769
Carl Efraim Carpelan 1769
Magnus Adolf von Kothen 1769–1775
Georg Gustaf Wrangel 1775–1781
Carl Wilhelm Leijonstedt 1781–1782
Fredrik von Stenhagen 1782–1789
Johan Gustaf af Donner 1789–1795
Pehr Adam Stromberg 1795–1809

Saint Petersburg Governorate 1721–1744 

 Fjodor Apraksin 1721–1723
 Pjotr Apraksin, 1724–1725
 Aleksandr Menshikov 1725–1727
 Jan Kazimierz Sapieha 1727–1728
 Burkhard Christoph von Münnich 1728–1734
 Vasili Saltykov 1734–1740
 Jakov Shahovskoi 1740
 Nikolai Golovin 1742
 Peter von Lacy 1743
 Vasili Repnin 1744
 Stepan Ignatiev 1744

Vyborg Governorate 1744–1812 

 Yury Nikitich Repnin 1744
 Afanasey Isakov 1745–1752 (acting) 
 Johann Christoph von Keyser 1752–1754
 Afanasey Isakov 1754–1766
 Nikolaus Hendrik von Engelhardt 1766–1778 
 Yevgeny Petrovich Kashkin 1779–1780
 Pyotr Alekseyevich Stupishin 1780–1782
 Wilhelm Heinrich von Engelhardt 1782–1785 
 Alexander Magnus von Peutling 1785–1785 
 Karl Johann von Günzel 1785–1793 
 Fyodor Pavlovich Shcherbatov 1793–1797 
 Karl Magnus von Rüdinger 1797–1799 
 Pyotr Vasilyevich Zheltuhin 1799–1799 
 Magnus Orraeus 1799–1804 
 Nikolay Fyodorovich Emin 1804–1808 
 Ivan Jakovlevich Bukharin 1808–1811
 Johan Winter 1811–1812

See also
Governor General of Finland
Governor-General in the Swedish Realm
County Governors of Sweden

References

Government of Finland